Magic Pinocchio is the second album by French virtual singer Pinocchio, released by EMI Music France on March 9, 2007.

The album debuted at number 196 in France, briefly re-entering at number 122 four months later.

Track listing

Charts

References 

2007 albums
Pinocchio (virtual singer) albums
EMI Music France albums